The Life and Times of Vivienne Vyle is a British sitcom that was originally aired on BBC Two in 2007. The programme was written and created by Jennifer Saunders and Tanya Byron. The show stars Saunders as the title character of the talk show host, a caricature of Jeremy Kyle and other talk show hosts.

Background and content 
The Life and Times of Vivienne Vyle is described as a black comedy and a show-within-a-show, following both the on-screen and off-screen life of fictional TV host Vivienne Vyle, played by Jennifer Saunders. The programme follows the life of Vyle as she tries to balance her newly ascendant fame with her personal life. The BBC described the show as "Ab Fab meets The Larry Sanders Show with quite a bit of Ricki Lake and Oprah thrown in".

In a similar vein to confessional-style shows such as The Jerry Springer Show and Trisha, Vyle's show has episodes dedicated to raunchy and sensationalistic themes such as "My son calls the wrong man daddy" and "I want a vagina but can't kick the crack!" Vyle's name is a spoof on Jeremy Kyle, whose mannerisms and style of show are both parodied by Saunders' portrayal of Vyle.

The series is co-written with psychologist Tanya Byron, who originally came up with the idea and approached Saunders. Producer Jo Sargent stated: "She presented the idea for a comedy on the subject to Saunders, the aim being a black comedy with pop psychology at the root".

Plot
The Life and Times of Vivienne Vyle revolves around Vivienne Vyle, a former weather presenter and presenter on TV-am, who now has her own talk show. Desperate for success, she is encouraged by the show's ambitious producer Helena De'Wend, who also owns her own production company. Helena is always trying to improve ratings, and her child only speaks Spanish as the nanny spends more time with him than with his mother. Vivienne's husband is Jared, who is gay and loves karaoke. Her PR adviser is Miriam, who is a transgender woman for whom Jared has an intense dislike. Vivienne's main rival is Chris Connor, who unlike Vyle has a good rapport with his audience.

The Vivienne Vyle Show'''s new psychotherapist is Dr. Jonathan Fowler, who constantly protests that many of the show's guests are too mentally unstable to appear on the show. The floor manager is the organised Carol and the director is Des. Abigail is the runner and Damien the researcher, who also builds up tension with the guests before they appear on the show.

 Reception The Life and Times of Vivienne Vyle received a generally unfavourable reception by critics. The New York Times wrote: "You might even tear up. But it still would have been better to leave us laughing." Variety wrote that "the intentionally awkward moments are just that, failing to generate any appreciable laughs." 

PopMatters wrote: "this, for the most part, is anything but uplifting. Not that the first five episodes aren't worth watching (they are, but it's not for light laughs), but it's a shame it took until the last one of this series [...] to find its comic stride." The Guardian critic wrote: "The Life and Times of Vivienne Vyle may be topical but it isn't clever, funny or entertaining", before another author from the same publication countered this opinion, writing, "The viewers and critics are wrong."

Cast
Jennifer Saunders - Vivienne Vyle
Miranda Richardson - Helena De'Wend
Conleth Hill - Jared
Jason Watkins - Dr Jonathan Fowler
Antonia Campbell-Hughes - Abigail Wilson
Helen Griffin - Carol
Dave Lamb - Des
Lawry Lewin - Damien
Christopher Ryan - Miriam
Rochelle Gadd - Dionne
Brian Conley - Chris Connor

Episodes

Worldwide broadcastThe Life and Times of Vivienne Vyle'' aired on Showcase in Canada, Sundance Channel in the United States, yes stars Base in Israel, Comedy Central in The Netherlands, GNT in Brazil, RTP2 in Portugal, DR2 in Denmark, YLE in Finland and UKTV in Australia.

References

External links
 

2000s British black comedy television series
2000s British sitcoms
2007 British television series debuts
2007 British television series endings
BBC television sitcoms
British parody television series
English-language television shows
Narcissism in fiction
Television series about television